The 1973–74 season was the 59th in the history of the Isthmian League, an English football competition.

It was the first season in which the league was split into two divisions after sixteen new clubs joined the new Division Two. It was also the first season in which the Isthmian League used three points for a win.

Wycombe Wanderers won Division One, whilst Dagenham won Division Two.

Division One

League table

Division Two

It was the first season of Division Two, fifteen clubs joined the Isthmian League from different divisions of the Athenian League, while Hertford Town were transferred from the Eastern Counties League.

League table

References

Isthmian League seasons
I